InPost S.A. (Euronext Amsterdam: INPST) is a Polish public logistics limited company with courier, package delivery and express mail service. It is based in Kraków, Poland, and it is owned by Integer.pl corporate group. The company specializes in parcel locker service operated in Poland, Italy, United Kingdom, France, Benelux, Spain and Portugal.

Founded in 2006 in Poland by Rafal Brzoska, InPost provides delivery services through a network of more than 20.000 lockers (Automated Parcels Machines or "APMs") and 18.000 pick-up drop-off points ("PUDOs"), as well as to-door courier and fulfilment services to e-commerce merchants.

History 

Integer.pl Group was established in 1999 by Rafał Brzoska as a company dealing with the distribution of leaflets. In 2006, InPost S.A. was founded as a subsidiary.

In 2009, The Integer.pl Capital Group, introduced InPost Lockers – self-service machines for receiving and sending parcels. In 2015, the company's offering expanded to include courier service and it also made its debut on the Warsaw Stock Exchange. The company has been cooperating with the American Advent International fund since 2017.

InPost SA went public in January 2021 on the Amsterdam Stock Exchange after its shareholders raised 2.8 billion euros as an online shopping boom increased demand for its automated parcel lockers.

In July 2021, InPost acquired Mondial Relay, a logistics company from France.

See also
Economy of Poland
List of Polish companies

References

External links 

Transport companies established in 2006
Polish companies established in 2006
Companies based in Kraków
Postal organizations
Logistics companies
Companies of Poland
Companies formerly listed on the Warsaw Stock Exchange